Spilarctia bifasciata is a moth in the family Erebidae. It was described by Arthur Gardiner Butler in 1881. It is found in Japan.

References

Arctiidae genus list at Butterflies and Moths of the World of the Natural History Museum

Moths described in 1881
bifasciata